Waldemar Cierpinski (born 3 August 1950) is a former East German athlete and two time Olympic Champion in the marathon. 

He lives in Halle an der Saale.

Career
He was born to Polish parents who had moved to Germany in 1945, in Neugattersleben, in Saxony-Anhalt, then East Germany. Waldemar Cierpinski was originally a successful steeplechase runner but decided to switch to the marathon in 1974.

He was virtually unknown when he entered the 1976 Olympic marathon. He ran with the lead pack until American Frank Shorter broke free after the 25 km mark. Cierpinski chased Shorter down then took the lead, winning the race by 51 seconds. His victory was so unexpected that in the Olympic football final that evening, goalkeeper Jürgen Croy, invoked Cierpinski, a "living example of mediocrity", to inspire  East Germany to a 3–1 victory over fancied Poland. 

Cierpinski finished in fourth place at the 1978 European Championships. In the 1980 Summer Olympics, Cierpinski ran wisely and didn't match the suicidal pace the leaders had set. He caught up to the leaders at the 36 km mark and soon led by a healthy margin. Although Gerard Nijboer from the Netherlands narrowed the gap in the last kilometre, Cierpinski sprinted the last 200 m to win his second consecutive Olympic gold medal and duplicate the feat of legendary Ethiopian Abebe Bikila of winning two straight Olympic marathons.

Cierpinski finished third in the marathon in the 1983 World Championships in Athletics. He was denied a chance of an unprecedented third Olympic marathon win by the Eastern Bloc boycott of the 1984 Summer Olympics in Los Angeles, which was  Tit for tat for the United States-led boycott of the 1980 Summer Olympics in Moscow. He left competition the same year and started a coaching career.

In Track & Field News World Rankings, Cierpinski was ranked first in the marathon in 1976 and 1980 and eighth in 1978 and 1983.

Waldemar Cierpinski is now a member of the German Olympic Committee. Since 2007 Cierpinski has been an honorary member of the SG WiP Goettingen 06.

Drug allegations
It is now well known that East Germany operated a state-sponsored system of providing performance-enhancing drugs to as many as 10,000 athletes from about 1968 to 1988. Cierpinski was implicated by East German track and field research files uncovered by Werner Franke at the Stasi headquarters in Leipzig in the late 1990s.

As a result, 1976 silver medallist Frank Shorter has advocated the belief that Cierpinski cheated and has supported official review of past performances, i.e. considering stripping medals from athletes who are found later on to have cheated, as a deterrent to drug-cheats. Fourth-place finisher Don Kardong has also written that he believed Cierpinski was involved in the East German doping program. Shorter's allegations are very similar to those of Shirley Babashoff, who accused the East German women of drug cheating during the swimming events in the same Olympic Games, which was later substantiated by investigators in the PBS documentary, "Secrets of the Dead: Doping for Gold."

References

External links
 Cierpinski's personal website

1950 births
Living people
People from Salzlandkreis
Sportspeople from Saxony-Anhalt
East German male marathon runners
East German male long-distance runners
East German male steeplechase runners
Athletes (track and field) at the 1976 Summer Olympics
Athletes (track and field) at the 1980 Summer Olympics
Olympic athletes of East Germany
World Athletics Championships athletes for East Germany
Olympic gold medalists for East Germany
World Athletics Championships medalists
Medalists at the 1980 Summer Olympics
Medalists at the 1976 Summer Olympics
Olympic gold medalists in athletics (track and field)
Recipients of the Patriotic Order of Merit (honor clasp)